Arachnid is a 2001 Spanish horror film directed by Jack Sholder. The film centers on a group of plane crash survivors who has to survive the attacks of a giant alien spider. The film stars Alex Reid, Chris Potter, Rocqueford Allen, Robert Vicencio and José Sancho. It was the second film under the Fantastic Factory Label, created by Brian Yuzna and Julio Fernandez in Spain. The film received negative reviews.

Plot

In the South Pacific, a translucent alien spaceship hovers over the sea. Meanwhile, a test stealth plane piloted by Joli Mercer comes across the spacecraft and chases it. The plane begins to malfunction and Joli lands on a nearby island, finding an alien which a giant spider kills and then Joli.

10 months later, Loren Mercer is required to be the pilot of a medical expedition organized by Dr. Samuel Leon and assistant Susana Gabriel, after having received a native from an island who died from an unknown virus. The expedition is led by Lev Valentine with soldiers Bear and Reyes, arachnologist Henry Capri, native guide Toe Boy and two natives. Once they reach the island, the plane begins to malfunction and they are forced to land on the beach.

Next morning, the expedition goes into the jungle but some strange ticks burrow into Reyes. Upon reaching the village, they find that everything is deserted and Capri discovers that several insects have mutated. Then the ticks start to come out of Reyes and Bear kills him to end his pain. That night, Loren is investigating on her own when the group is attacked by a giant centipede, killing one of the natives. Loren finds some of her brother's clothes and confesses to Valentine that his brother was left for dead but she is still looking for him. Valentine decides they all are leaving the island the next morning, although Loren and Capri want to stay. 

Next day, Valentine agrees to help Loren find Joli once they get everyone off the island but Capri is not in the village. Bear is sent with a native to find a radio signal for help but when they walk down a river, a small spider throws acid in the native's face killing him. Capri finds the giant centipede dying but the giant spider attacks him. The rest of the group find the remains of Joli's brother stuck in a tree. Later they find Capri covered in spider web and bitten by the spider. He explains there's a giant spider in the island and deduce it's an alien. Capri asks to be killed and Susana does it. The giant spider reaches them but Samuel flees while the others shoot the spider but they end up running. While doing so, Susana is trapped in spider webs that were in the middle of the way but Loren and Valentine help her using Capri's liquid nitrogen. Samuel is caught by the spider and kills him by melting his face with acid.

The three enter a military bunker but Toe Boy has disappeared. The spider attacks them through one of the windows. Valentine attacks the spider with a machete but the spider cuts him off with a fang. Loren shoots the spider in an eye and it flees. At night the spider sneaks through the bunker's roof and they lock in a small room. Susana suffering claustrophobia opens the door thinking the spider left but it kills her with its stinger. The spider tries to enter the room but they tear off a leg by closing the door. They escape through a trapdoor to underground tunnels. Outside they fall asleep and Loren has a nightmare. Next morning, Bear and Toe Boy find them and they all decide to kill the spider.

On the way, a weak Valentine stays behind. On the nest, they find the spider breeding in a silk cocoon over a spider egg sac. Loren plans to knock the spider down and have Bear shoot it to death, but it awakes early and kills Bear. Loren throws Toe Boy's vial of black widow poison to the spider, hurting it. The spider chases Loren but upon stumbling, it traps her in spider web. When the spider is about to kill her, Valentine appears shooting at it while Toe Boy throws darts. As the spider tries to flee, Loren pulls the spider web thread to fall off the ceiling on a stalagmite, killing it. As they walk the jungle, another giant spider watches them from an overhead cliff.

Cast
Alex Reid as Loren Mercer
Chris Potter as Lev Valentine
José Sancho as Dr. Samuel Leon
Neus Asensi as Susana Gabriel
Ravil Isyanov as Henry Capri
Rocqueford Allen as Bear
Robert Vicencio as Toe Boy
Luis Lorenzo Crespo as Reyes
Jesús Cabrero as Joli Mercer/Lightfoot
Héctor Chiquín as Native 1
Conejo Wilson as Native 2
Fausto Gualsaqui as Native 3

Arachnid was the first role of Alex Reid's acting career. José Sancho agreed to participate in the movie since he had never worked a film with so many special effects. Neus Asensi was excited about working on the film as it was her first role in a film shot entirely in English, also because this type of movies are not normally made in Spain.

Production

Written by Mark Sevi, the script was brought to Yuzna by Sheri Bryant and went ahead thanks to one of Filmax's executives, who was a big fan of 1950s monster movies. Yuzna argued that a giant monster movie was a good idea to make since it has no plot elements that would be controversial in any country in the world. The script was re-written by Yuzna and Sevi, adding the little creatures before the giant spider shows up to build tension and the village.

It is the second film under the Fantastic Factory label and the second film to be released by the label in 2001 after Faust: Love of the Damned got released in Spain in January. The film was shot in Barcelona for on-set scenes and Mexico for outdoors scenes from May to July 2000.

Brian Yuzna contacted Robert Kurtzman and Tobe Hooper to direct the film but Julio Fernández, one of the producers and creators of Fantastic Factory, suggested Jack Sholder after watching The Hidden. The main spider design and other creatures practical effects were created by Steve Johnson and his team, XFX.

Release

Theatrical release
Arachnid received a limited release in United States on October 12, 2001. In Spain got released on June 29, 2001. It grossed around €301.832 ($351.364) and had 73.542 viewers.

According to Fantastic Factory: El Cine de los Condenados (Fantastic Factory: Cinema of the Damned), a Spanish book about the label, the budget was €543.400 ($561.000) and grossed €1.100.656 ($1.137.414) worldwide.

Home media
The film was released on DVD by Mosaic Movies on February 18, 2002. It was re-released by both Lionsgate and Maple Pictures in the United States and Canada respectively on March 26, 2002. It was released by Mosaic Movies again on February 17, 2003.

In Spain had a VHS and DVD release in late 2001. The DVD version includes a trailer, interviews (with José Sancho, Neus Asensi and Luis Lorenzo Crespo), making of, Spanish TV spots and some storyboards. This DVD version was also included in a Fantastic Factory DVD collection along Faust: Love of the Damned, Dagon and Romasanta.

In April 2011, Arrow Video released in United Kingdom a DVD collection named "Fantastic Factory presents..." which included Arachnid, Faust: Love of the Damned, Romasanta and Beyond Re-Animator. This DVD has the original trailer and interviews with producer Brian Yuzna and creature designer Steve Johnson.

Reception
Arachnid received negative reviews for the lackluster CGI, script, low budget and acting while the practical special effects received some praise. Spanish reviews were mixed to negative. The newspaper El País said: "Jack Sholder knows that the important thing is to have a good time and scrupulously comply with the commandments of the subgenre: monsters with a rancid look, killing the actors in inverse order to their charisma and their salary. To watch and discuss with friends, a lot of desire to party and a lot of popcorn." While the film magazine Fotogramas rated it 3/5.

Horror website Dread Central rated the film 1 and a half out of 5. Popcorn Pictures.com gave the film a negative score of three out of ten, writing,"Arachnid is a cheap and lacklustre giant spider flick, ultimately indistinguishable from the next spider flick and where the only bite is the amount it’ll gorge from your wallet." eFilmCritic.com awarded the film two out of five stars, calling it "A step up in quality", but also criticized the film's unappealing characters, and poor creature effects. Buzz McClain from Allmovie gave the film a more positive review. In his review of the film, McClain noted that in spite of the film's numerous flaws, "There's a certain brainless charm to it all that will amuse those looking for nothing more than a few cool maulings and no amount of intellectual challenge."

In an interview for the film's documentary, "Behind the Curtain Part II" (2012), director Jack Sholder, confessed that he disliked the movie:

References

External links

2001 films
2001 horror films
2010s monster movies
2000s English-language films
Films shot in Barcelona
Natural horror films
Spanish horror films
Giant monster films
Films about spiders
Films directed by Jack Sholder